Shadows Over St. Pauli (German:Schatten über St. Pauli) is a 1938 German drama film directed by Fritz Kirchhoff and starring Marieluise Claudius, Gustav Knuth and Hellmuth Bergmann. It was filmed and shot in Hamburg, and the title refers to the St. Pauli district of the city.

Cast
 Marieluise Claudius as Hanna Carstens  
 Gustav Knuth as Oschi Rasmus  
 Hellmuth Bergmann as Wilhelm Schenk  
 Harald Paulsen as Heinrich Lafrenz  
 Theodor Loos as John Carstens 
 Klaus Detlef Sierck as Hummel  
 Maria Koppenhöfer as Mrs. Lafrens  
 Walter Werner as Ohm Timmer  
 Erich Dunskus as Ewermann  
 Margot Erbst as Frau Ewermann  
 Otty Eberhardt as Tante Guschi 
 Alfred Maack as Bredenkamp  
 Peter Elsholtz as Martens  
 Wilhelm König as Fietje 
 Paul Rehkopf as Schiffer Karl  
 Ernst Rotmund as Kagelmacher  
 Viggo Larsen as Kapitän Larsen  
 Olaf Bach as Terbrüggen, Steuermann 
 Albert Hehn as Ein junger Barkassenführer  
 Charly Berger as Beamter der Wasserschutzpolizei  
 Josef Kamper as Jan  
 Karin Luesebrink as Junge Mädchen auf der 'Jungen Liebe'  
 Trude Lehmann as Ein dickes Mädchen im Tanzlokal  
 Herbert Lindner 
 Arthur Reinhardt as Beamter  
 Ernst Sattler as Müller Buchhalter  
 Walter Steinbeck as Mr. Holdefleiß

References

Bibliography 
 Bock, Hans-Michael & Bergfelder, Tim. The Concise CineGraph. Encyclopedia of German Cinema. Berghahn Books, 2009.

External links 
 

1938 films
Films of Nazi Germany
German drama films
1938 drama films
1930s German-language films
Films directed by Fritz Kirchhoff
Films set in Hamburg
German black-and-white films
1930s German films